Abrothallus canariensis is a species of lichenicolous fungus in the family Abrothallaceae. Found in the Canary Islands, it was formally described as a new species in 2015 by Sergio Pérez-Ortega, Pieter van den Boom, and Ave Suija. The type specimen was collected from Chinobre (Santa Cruz de Tenerife), where it was found on a Pseudocyphellaria aurata lichen that itself was growing on a species of Erica. The species epithet refers to the area of its type locality. The fungus is similar to Abrothallus secedens, but unlike that species, has four-spored asci, and larger ascospores that measure 16–25 by 6–9.5 μm.

References

canariensis
Lichenicolous fungi
Fungi described in 2015
Fungi of the Canary Islands
Taxa named by Ave Suija